Sir Thomas Percy (c. 1504 – 2 June 1537) was a participant in the 1537 Bigod's Rebellion in the aftermath of the Pilgrimage of Grace, a Roman Catholic uprising against King Henry VIII. He was convicted of treason and hanged, drawn and quartered at Tyburn. The Catholic Encyclopedia (1913) states that he "is considered a martyr by many".

Origins
He was born in about 1504 at Alnwick Castle, Northumberland, the second son of Henry Percy, 5th Earl of Northumberland by his wife Lady Catherine Spencer.

Inheritance in his issue
His elder brother Henry Percy, 6th Earl of Northumberland, who had long been failing in health, died after having been persuaded to leave all his estates to King Henry VIII. However, the earldom was restored to Thomas's eldest son, who was succeeded in the title by his younger brother, from whom all later Earls and Dukes of Northumberland are descended.

Marriage and children
Percy married Eleanor Harbottle, daughter of Guiscard Harbottle of Beamish, County Durham (d. Battle of Flodden Field), by his wife Jane Willoughby, with whom he had seven children:

Thomas Percy, 7th Earl of Northumberland, 
Henry Percy, 8th Earl of Northumberland,
Guiscard Percy 
Richard Percy 
Joan Percy
Mary Percy, wife of Sir Francis Slingsby; progenitors of all Slingsby Baronets
Catherine Percy.

References

1504 births
1537 deaths
People executed by Tudor England by hanging, drawing and quartering
Thomas Percy, knight|Sir Thomas Percy
Executed people from Northumberland
People executed under the Tudors for treason against England
People from Alnwick
People executed under Henry VIII
Younger sons of earls